Hugo da Conceição Medeiros Borges Alves (born 1 January 1998), commonly known as Hugo Borges, is a Brazilian footballer who plays  as a forward for Greek Super League 2 club Proodeftiki.

Career statistics

Club

References

1998 births
Living people
Brazilian footballers
Brazilian expatriate footballers
Association football forwards
CR Vasco da Gama players
Sport Club Corinthians Paulista players
C.D. Jorge Wilstermann players
Brazilian expatriate sportspeople in Bolivia
Expatriate footballers in Bolivia
People from Duque de Caxias, Rio de Janeiro
Sportspeople from Rio de Janeiro (state)